Eremobina is a genus of moths of the family Noctuidae erected by James Halliday McDunnough in 1937.

Species
 Eremobina claudens (Walker, 1857) (syn: Eremobina albertina (Hampson, 1908), Eremobina hillii (Grote, 1876), Eremobina hanhami (Barnes & Benjamin, 1924)
 Eremobina leucoscelis (Grote, 1874) (syn: Eremobina jocasta (Smith, 1900), Eremobina fibulata (Morrison, 1874))
 Eremobina pabulatricula (Brahm, 1791)
 Eremobina unicincta (Smith, 1902)

References

Acronictinae